Georg von Schanz (12 March 1853 – 19 December 1931) was a German legal scholar. He originally developed a definition of income, now known as Haig-Simons income.

References

1853 births
1931 deaths
Jurists from Bavaria
Members of the Bavarian Reichsrat
Ludwig Maximilian University of Munich alumni
People from Rhön-Grabfeld